Otto Schöpp (4 June 1907 – 29 January 1973) was a Romanian hurdler. He competed in the men's 110 metres hurdles at the 1928 Summer Olympics.

References

External links
 

1907 births
1973 deaths
Athletes (track and field) at the 1928 Summer Olympics
Romanian male hurdlers
Romanian male high jumpers
Olympic athletes of Romania